Main Street School is a historic school building located at Port Washington in Nassau County, New York.  It was completed in 1909 in the Georgian Revival style.  It was built as a two-story, brick building with stone detailing and a cement-stucco faced raised basement level.  A third story was added during a 1917 expansion.  It features a steep gable roof topped by an ornamental cupola with four clock faces.  The roof has five gable dormers with round-headed windows.

It was listed on the National Register of Historic Places in 1983.

References

School buildings on the National Register of Historic Places in New York (state)
Georgian Revival architecture in New York (state)
School buildings completed in 1908
Schools in Nassau County, New York
National Register of Historic Places in Nassau County, New York
1908 establishments in New York (state)